WCTZ may refer to:

 WCTZ-LD, a low-power television station (channel 35) licensed to serve Bowling Green, Kentucky, United States
 WARW (FM), a radio station (96.7 FM) licensed to serve Port Chester, New York, United States, which held the call sign WCTZ from 2006 to 2011
 WQZQ, a radio station (830 AM) licensed to serve Goodlettsville, Tennessee, United States, which held the call sign WCTZ from 1988 to 2005